City Morgue is an American hip hop group from New York City which consists of rappers ZillaKami (Junius Rogers) and SosMula (Vinicius Sosa).

History
Prior to the formation of City Morgue in 2017, Junius Rogers, professionally known as ZillaKami, worked extensively with 6ix9ine in the underground hip-hop scene in New York City and allegedly ghostwrote many of 6ix9ine's early songs. His other collaborator was his older half-brother Peter Rogers, known professionally as Righteous P, the CEO of music label Hikari-Ultra. The brothers had a falling out with 6ix9ine after he allegedly refused to pay back money owed and ripped instrumentals from the group. In response, ZillaKami and other detractors publicly circulated information about 6ix9ine's child sexual performance charge.

ZillaKami had met Vinicius Sosa, known professionally as SosMula, on his first day out of jail, and started creating songs some time after meeting with record producer Bouabdallah Sami Nehari, known professionally as Thraxx. Together, the trio had made many projects since then, including numerous singles, some of which being Sk8 Head, Shinners13, 33rd Blakk Glass, and an album City Morgue Vol 1: Hell or High Water.

ZillaKami was also featured on Denzel Curry's 2018 single "Vengeance", and in turn, Curry had City Morgue on the Ta13oo tour. On November 19, 2018, City Morgue sold out their first headline show in New York City at Saint Vitus Bar located in Brooklyn.

City Morgue was then featured in the $uicideboy$ GREY DAY starting July 24, 2019, and ending August 24, 2019. They were present for all shows minus: Norfolk, VA, Des Moines, IA, and the Montreal shows with ZillaKami stating he was not allowed in Canada On December 13, 2019, City Morgue released their second album City Morgue Vol. 2: As Good as Dead. On the same day, City Morgue was featured on the track Wardogz by GRAVEDGR.

On July 23, 2020, City Morgue released a video for Hurtworld '99, which acted as the lead single for their Toxic Boogaloo mixtape that was released on July 31, 2020. They also released videos for The Electric Experience and Yakuza on August 5 and August 12, 2020, respectively.

On September 28, 2021, City Morgue released the single What's My Name. It acted as the lead single to their third studio album City Morgue Vol 3: Bottom of the Barrel. 

On June 24, 2022, ZillaKami announced that the next summer tour would most likely be their last City Morgue tour. SosMula later announced that the next album in City Morgue's discography would be their last. Despite the announcement, this tour was not their last.

Musical style
The duo's music had been categorised as punk rap, trap metal, hardcore rap, nu metal, rap metal, rap rock, and alternative hip hop, often containing elements of extreme metal and shock rock. During an interview, they stated that their music "is just a modern take on nu-metal. It's more trap, with more 808s and high-hats". Kerrang! writer Gary Suarez said that their "unflinchingly hostile blend of trap and metal... careens towards misanthropy and nihilism to an alarming extent". In an article for Revolver, their music was described as "full of queasy synth, destabilizing bass and disconcerting bars". Cat Jones from Kerrang described their music as "ZillaKami's raspy vocals are punctuated by SosMula's higher register over metal samples in a way that feels terrifying and entrancing at the same time". Tom Breihan of Stereogum, said their music "take[s] all the face-tatted fuck-shit-up tendencies of the young SoundCloud rap scene, and they blow that stuff way the hell out of proportion, scream-rapping about drugs and murder with rabid ferocity". Respect magazine said they "spin gothic hood tales, harking back to timeless East Coast hip-hop—yet sharpened by their signature dark metallic edge".

City Morgue are primarily influenced by punk rock, hardcore punk, nu metal and hardcore hip hop. They cite influences such as Behemoth, Slipknot, Title Fight, DMX, Radiohead, Onyx, Eminem and Tyler, the Creator.

Discography

Studio albums

Mixtapes

EPs

Singles

Non-Album Songs

References

American nu metal musical groups
Alternative hip hop musicians
Hardcore hip hop groups
Hip hop duos
Hip hop groups from New York City
Rap metal musical groups
Rap rock groups
Trap metal musicians